East Side, West Side may refer to:

Books
East Side, West Side (novel), 1947 American novel by Marcia Davenport
East Side, West Side: Tales of New York Sporting Life 1910–1960, 1998 American sports book by Lawrence S. Ritter

Film and TV
East Side - West Side (1923 film), American silent drama
East Side West Side (1925 film), American silent animated short from Fleischer Studios
East Side, West Side (1927 film), American silent drama
East Side West Side (1929 film), American sound remake of 1925 Fleischer short a/k/a The Sidewalks of New York
East Side, West Side (1949 film), American drama based on Marcia Davenport's novel
East Side West Side (TV series), 1963–64 American drama series

Songs
"East Side, West Side" (song), 1894 American composition a/k/a "The Sidewalks of New York"
"East Side West Side", 2014 song by American Jimmy Ruffin